"Del Mar" is a song by Puerto Rican singer Ozuna, American rapper and singer Doja Cat and Australian singer-songwriter Sia. The track was released as part of Ozuna's fourth studio album ENOC on September 4, 2020, and was later sent to radio as the album's sixth single in October 2020. Over a reggaeton instrumental, the singers perform in verses which alternate between Spanish and English. It was the first-ever Spanish language song and collaboration for both Sia and Doja Cat.

Background and release 
The song was first mentioned by Sia in an August 2020 interview with Open House Party; she stated that she had a collaboration lined up with Ozuna and Doja Cat. In an interview with Billboard, Ozuna revealed that Doja Cat and Sia sent him their vocals for the track in less than 24 hours of him asking, and allowed him to do with them what he wished. "Del Mar" was released on September 4, 2020, with no prior announcement, as part of Ozuna's album ENOC. In October 2020, the track was released as a single after being serviced to rhythmic radio in the United States.

Critical reception 
Jessica Roiz of Billboard described the song as "hip-shaking" and "fantasy-like", while Leila Cobo of the same publication described it as "beautiful" and "island-tinged". Diego Oritz of Rolling Stone also deemed it a "beach bum love song" and wrote that it is a prime example of how "latin trap and hip-hop come together harmoniously with native Caribbean rhythms like dembow, dancehall, soca and reggaeton" on the ENOC record.

Music video 
The official music video for "Del Mar", directed by Nuno Gomes, was released on October 15, 2020. It features Ozuna and Doja Cat, as well as Sia in the form of a water nymph hologram, takes place under the sea, and is laden with special effects. Critics noted that the video took inspiration from Atlantis and The Little Mermaid. The video received a nomination for Favorite Music Video at the 2021 Latin American Music Awards.

Live performances 
Ozuna promoted the single by performing it on his Tiny Desk Concert with NPR, as well as on Jimmy Kimmel Live! alongside Doja Cat.

Charts

Weekly charts

Year-end charts

Certifications

Release history

References 

2020 songs
Reggaeton songs
2020 singles
Spanglish songs
Sia (musician) songs
Ozuna (singer) songs
Doja Cat songs
Songs written by Ozuna (singer)
Songs written by Doja Cat
Songs written by Sia (musician)